Bruce Billings may refer to:
 Bruce Billings (baseball)
 Bruce Billings (cartoonist)
 Bruce H. Billings, American physicist